The 1965 International Cross Country Championships was held in Ostend, Belgium, at the Hippodrome Wellington on March 20, 1965. The competition saw first appearances of athletes from Algeria, New Zealand and West Germany.   A report on the event was given in the Glasgow Herald.

Complete results for men, junior men, medallists, 
 and the results of British athletes were published.

Medallists

Individual Race Results

Men's (7.5 mi / 12.1 km)

Junior Men's (4.7 mi / 7.5 km)

Team Results

Men's

Junior Men's

Participation
An unofficial count yields the participation of 174 athletes from 15 countries.

 (14)
 (14)
 (14)
 (9)
 (8)
 (12)
 (14)
 (9)
 (9)
 (13)
 (14)
 (9)
 (13)
 (14)
 (8)

See also
 1965 in athletics (track and field)

References

International Cross Country Championships
International Cross Country Championships
Cross
International Cross Country Championships
Cross country running in Belgium